Weber's syndrome, also known as midbrain stroke syndrome or superior alternating hemiplegia, is a form of stroke that affects the medial portion of the midbrain. It involves oculomotor fascicles in the interpeduncular cisterns and cerebral peduncle so it characterizes the presence of an ipsilateral lower motor neuron type oculomotor nerve palsy and contralateral hemiparesis or hemiplegia.

Cause
It is mainly caused by a midbrain infarction as a result of occlusion of a branch of posterior cerebral artery most commonly or the paramedian branches of basilar bifurcation perforating arteries.

This lesion is usually unilateral and affects several structures in the midbrain including:

Diagnosis
Clinical findings mainly eyeball is down and out ipsilateral lateral squint.
Ptosis present as the levator palpebrae superioris nerve supply is disrupted.
Pupil dilated and fixed.
Contralateral hemiplegia
CT scan or MRI might help in delineating  the cause or the vessel or region of brain involved in stroke.

Management

History
It carries the name of Sir Hermann David Weber, a German-born physician working in London, who described the condition in 1863. It is unrelated to Sturge–Weber syndrome, Klippel–Trénaunay–Weber syndrome or Osler–Weber–Rendu syndrome. These conditions are named for his son Frederick Parkes Weber.

See also
 Alternating hemiplegia of childhood
 Lateral medullary syndrome
 Lateral pontine syndrome
 Medial medullary syndrome
 Medial pontine syndrome

References

External links

Stroke
Syndromes affecting the nervous system